The 2020 Delaware House of Representatives elections took place as part of the biennial 2020 United States elections. Delaware voters elected state representatives in all 41 districts. State representatives serve two-year terms in the Delaware House of Representatives.

The primary election on September 15, 2020 determined which candidates appeared on the November 3, 2020 general election ballot.

Following the previous election in 2018, Democrats retained control of the Delaware House with 26 seats to Republicans' 15 seats. To reclaim control of the chamber from Democrats, Republicans needed to net six House seats.

Democrats retained control of the Delaware House following the 2020 general election, with the balance of power remaining unchanged: 26 D to 15 R.

Predictions

Summary of results

Source:

Closest races 
Seats where the margin of victory was under 10%:

Overall results

Detailed Results

Note: Delaware does not report results in uncompetitive primaries (i.e., races with only one candidate per party in the primary). Therefore, most districts do not include primary results.

District 1

District 2

District 3

District 4

District 5

District 6

District 7

District 8

District 9

District 10

District 11

District 12

District 13

District 14

District 15

District 16

District 17

District 18

District 19

District 20

District 21

District 22

District 23

District 24

District 25

District 26

District 27

District 28

District 29

District 30

District 31

District 32

District 33

District 34

District 35

District 36

District 37

District 38

District 39

District 40

District 41

See also
 2020 Delaware elections
 2020 United States presidential election in Delaware
 2020 United States House of Representatives election in Delaware
 2020 United States Senate election in Delaware
 2020 Delaware gubernatorial election
 2020 Delaware State Senate election
 Elections in Delaware
 2020 United States elections

References

House of Representatives
Delaware General Assembly elections
Delaware House
Delaware House of Representatives elections